Kim Bo-sub (born 10 January 1998) is a South Korean football midfielder who plays for Incheon United.

Career statistics

References

External links

1998 births
Living people
Association football midfielders
South Korean footballers
Incheon United FC players
Gimcheon Sangmu FC players
K League 1 players
Sportspeople from Incheon